Baljit Malwa (born 29 May 1968) is an Indian record producer, musician and singer-songwriter.

Discography

Filmography

References

Bhangra (music)
Living people
1969 births

ar:سوكشيندر شيندا